Balakrishnampatti is a panchayat town in Tiruchirappalli District  in the state of Tamil Nadu, India.

Demographics
At the 2001 India census, Balakrishnampatti had a population of 8596. Males constituted 49% of the population and females 51%. Balakrishnampatti had an average literacy rate of 62%, higher than the national average of 59.5%; with 57% of the males and 43% of females literate. 11% of the population were under 6 years of age.

References

Villages in Tiruchirappalli district